The 1961–62 Yugoslav Ice Hockey League season was the 20th season of the Yugoslav Ice Hockey League, the top level of ice hockey in Yugoslavia. Seven teams participated in the league, and Jesenice have won the championship.

Standings

Group A

Group B

Final ranking

Jesenice
Ljubljana
Partizan
Red Star
Beograd
Medveščak
Spartak Subotica

External links
Season on hrhockey

Yugo
Yugoslav Ice Hockey League seasons
1961–62 in Yugoslav ice hockey